Roy John "Sage" Hughes (January 11, 1911 – March 5, 1995) was an American professional baseball infielder, who played in Major League Baseball with the Cleveland Indians, St. Louis Browns, Philadelphia Phillies, and Chicago Cubs.

Hughes started six games at shortstop for the Cubs during the 1945 World Series, handling 31 total chances without an error, turned two double plays, and batted .294 with five hits, including a double, in 17 at bats.  That season, Hughes had been the Cubs' utility infielder, with Lennie Merullo at shortstop, however Hughes got the nod as the team's midfielder in all but one game of the 1945 World Series, won in seven games by the Detroit Tigers.

His ninth-inning single in Game 7 was the last hit by a Cubs player in a World Series game until Chicago made it to the 2016 World Series.

Including minor league service, his professional career spanned 18 seasons (1933–1947; 1949–1951).  

As a Major Leaguer, Hughes divided his time between second base (345 games), third base (170) and shortstop (154).  Altogether, he collected 705 hits in the Majors, including 105 doubles and 27 triples.

External links

1911 births
1995 deaths
Baseball players from Cincinnati
Chicago Cubs players
Cleveland Indians players
Columbus Red Birds players
Lakeland Pilots players
Major League Baseball infielders
Minneapolis Millers (baseball) players
Montreal Royals players
Newark Bears (IL) players
New Orleans Pelicans (baseball) players
Oakland Oaks (baseball) players
Philadelphia Phillies players
St. Louis Browns players
Zanesville Greys players